Dahlenburg is a Samtgemeinde ("collective municipality") in the district of Lüneburg, in Lower Saxony, Germany. Its seat is in the village Dahlenburg.

The Samtgemeinde Dahlenburg consists of the following municipalities:
 Boitze 
 Dahlem 
 Dahlenburg
 Nahrendorf 
 Tosterglope

Samtgemeinden in Lower Saxony